The Law of Civilization and Decay: An Essay on History is a book written by Brooks Adams in 1895. His intention was to prove that the rise and fall of civilizations follows a definite cycle of centralization and decay. Adams outlined this theory by sketching the patterns of major periods in western history, concentrating on economic and social factors.

Adams argues that social "movement," as in colonization and industrialization, leads to consolidation; consolidation, in turn, creates a comparative advantage for frugality versus artistic expression. Because Adams believed that these traits of the mind were heritable, he argues that consolidation led to the domination of one people over another, and the domination of one civilization over another. The successive rises and falls of empires were therefore dictated by their stage in this cycle relative to other empires, by which commercial centers moved from one city to another:
"In proportion as movement accelerates societies consolidate, and as societies consolidate they pass through a profound intellectual change. Energy ceases to find vent through the imagination and takes the form of capital; hence as civilizations advance, the imaginative temperament tends to disappear, while the economic instinct is fostered and thus substantially new varieties of men come to possess the world.
Nothing so portentous overhangs humanity as this mysterious and relentless acceleration of movement, which changes methods of competition and alters paths of trade; for by it countless millions of men and women are foredoomed to happiness or misery as certainly as the beasts and trees, which have flourished in the wilderness, are destined to vanish when the soil is subdued by man.

The Romans amassed the treasure by which they administered their Empire, through the plunder and enslavement of the world. The Empire cemented by that treasure crumbled when adverse exchanges carried the bullion of Italy to the shore of the Bosphorus. An accelerated movement among the semi-barbarians of the West caused the agony of the Crusades, amidst which Constantinople fell as the Italian cities rose; while Venice and Genoa, and with them the whole Arabic civilization, shriveled when Portugal established direct communication with Hindoostan.

The opening of the ocean as a highroad precipitated the Reformation and built up Antwerp, while in the end it ruined Spain; and finally the last great quickening of the age of steam, which centralized the world at London, bathed the earth in blood from the Mississippi to the Ganges. Thus religions are preached and are forgotten, empires rise and fall, philosophies are born and die, art and poetry bloom and fade, as societies pass from the disintegration wherein imagination kindles to the consolidation whose pressure ends in death."

Synopsis

Rome
In the Roman Republic, the wielders of government power were landowning farmers and husbandmen. The landowners, however, spent time away from home, and "were ill-fitted to endure the strain of the unrestricted economic competition of a centralized society. Consequently, their conquests had hardly consolidated before decay set in." 

Adams's concept of Roman decay is characterized by the rise of slavery within the Republic and, later, the Roman Empire. The landowners originally hired free men to work their land, generally very poor, so their debts to the landowners increased dramatically throughout the years. Sons would take on their father’s debts, which became so usurious that perpetual bondage to a landowner was the result. The entire system, judicial and fiscal, was thus structured around creating and maintaining debt. Usurers, through the courts, could buy, sell, and execute debtors, a system which slowly decreased capital and undermined the ability of the landowner to pay taxes and of the Republican to collect revenue. Income was supplemented through conquest, but military expansion could only delay the decline. 

Adams then argues that increasing centralization, through the rise of the Emperors, exacerbated class divisions between plebeian and publican, slave and free. As territory was added, the number of foreigners reduced to slavery in Italy increased, forming a hierarchy that had not existed under the Republic. This source of cheap labor doomed, increased the concentration of capital in the hands of a few, and landowners had barely enough to subsist, even in good times. At the slightest disaster, he was reduced to bankruptcy and debt. In Adams's words, "The Roman husbandman and soldier was doomed, for nature had turned against him; the task of history is but to ascertain his fate and trace the fortunes of his country after he had gone." 

Adams also blames the decline of Rome on the devaluation and centralization of the currency. Under the Emperors, coins were minted without real value, causing inflation and devaluation. The death knell for Roman power and influence occurred in AD 325 when Constantine moved the capital of the Empire to 
Constantinople. From then on, the Empire would be dependent on its far holdings for money, supplies, food, workers, slaves, and even emperors. Bankers and the moneyed elite replaced the citizen-soldier landholder, and mercenaries replaced the once-great Roman Legions. The western half of the Roman Empire itself declined until its last Emperor, Romulus Augustus, was deposed by barbarians in the fifth century AD.

Middle Ages
Adams proceeds from Rome to the Middle Ages, during which nomadic barbarians (primarily Germanic) settled and established kingdoms in the former Roman provinces of Gaul, Iberia and Italy. The small kingdoms were soon at war. Initially, these kingdoms, unlike the Empire, were able to support themselves. The cost was a loss of technology, and a temporary lapse of high civilization into the "Dark Ages". Christianity came to wield enormous power and wealth through the power of priests and the use of miracles until, by 1200, the Pope had far more power than any secular ruler. 

Overall, Adams describes the Middle Ages as a period of decentralization in Europe, where feudalism and manorialism, rather than nationalism, bound the people. Superstition and the "imaginative mind" gained preeminence. By 1095, the beginnings of Europe's modern nation-states could be discerned; controlled, often not willingly, by the Catholic Church. European society remained stagnant, as defensible fortresses preserved decentralized pockets of authority.

The First Crusade represents the first steps toward centralization in Western Europe, as religious fervor created the means for military innovation and economic invigoration. The "opening" of the Holy Land brought economic capital, cultural renaissance, and trade to the West. The renewed trade with the East allowed new imports (such as silk and spices) and a new market for European exports, encouraged centralization, and fueled tension between Church and the local governments. The local governmens began to target Church wealth in the form of monasteries, which often contained great hoards of tangible wealth. The Reformation emboldened secular monarchs to intimidate, coerce or abolish the monasteries to obtain their wealth, and this redistribution eventually led to the secular monarchies predominating over the Holy See.

Modernity
From the Reformation onward, power is centralized in the modern secular state through the exponential processes of colonization and industrialization. Trade with colonies invariably favored the mother country, and control over the colonies was absolute. The Industrial Revolution encouraged a mass movement of people into the cities, thereby concentrating the labor force. 

Despite these apparent advantages, Adams shows how these imperial states had already fallen by 1895 through economic decay. As centralization and industry increased, so too did the power of bankers and the "self-interested" competition of the free market. This economic system could not support these overseas empires indefinitely, and they were slowly dismantled as the disadvantages began to outweigh the advantages. Adams concludes that the decentralization of power will lead to the destruction of less economic societies through competition:

Reception

Contemporary reception
The first print of the book sold out within three months in England. Under the guidance of Henry Adams, a limited circulation of 250 copies was distributed in the United States. Notable first edition recipients included: 
 Secretary of State Richard Olney
 Associate Justice of the Supreme Court John Marshall Harlan
 future Associate Justice Oliver Wendell Holmes Jr.
 Speaker of the House Thomas Brackett Reed (who reportedly pessimistically agreed with Adams's thesis)
 Future President Theodore Roosevelt
 Senator Henry Cabot Lodge
 William Astor Chanler
 J. P. Morgan (to whom Chanler sent the book, with the understanding that he was the "enemy") 

Within the year, three American orders had been placed.

Roosevelt, a friend of Adams then serving as New York City Police Commissioner, gave the book a mostly positive review in the Forum, though he "emphatically dissented" from portions of its thesis. Roosevelt's review received a negative response from Charles Anderson Dana of the New York Sun. 

Professional reviewers were much more critical than Roosevelt, as were others among their social circle. Cecil Spring Rice wrote to Roosevelt and Elizabeth Sherman Cameron with derision regarding Adams's "discovery" and about historical theory generally. Holmes, who had influenced Adams's thinking, recommended the book to Sir Frederick Pollock, calling it "about the most (immediately) interesting history I ever read," though "it hardly strikes me science, but rather as a grotesque world poem."

Early popular characterizations of the book were as a piece of bimetallist propaganda, owing to Adams's previous work The Gold Standard and his activism on currency issues. It was mentioned in at least two contemporary lists of works on the currency question.

Legacy
Adams's biographer Arthur Beringause lauded The Law of Civilization and Decay as "a magnificent book, daring in conception and brilliant in execution," while reserving criticism for Adams's "outmoded" race theory and personal insecurity. Beringause positions the book as a corrective to Edward Gibbon and Karl Marx and a precedent for the works of Max Weber, Thorstein Veblen, Charles A. Beard, and Oswald Spengler.

Further reading
Daniel Aaron, The Unusable Man: An Essay on the Mind of Brooks Adams. The New England Quarterly vol. 21, no. 1 (1948): 3–33.

Thornton Anderson, Brooks Adams: Constructive Conservative. Cornell University Press (1951), reprint edition 
Rushton Coulbourn, "Review of The Law of Civilization and Decay: An Essay on History". The American Historical Review vol. 49, no. 1 (1943): 77–78.
Worthington Chauncey Ford, "Brooks Adams Biography",  (Accessed 9 April 2005).
Donald J. Pierce, "Review of The Law of Civilization and Decay: An Essay on History". Political Science Quarterly vol. 58, no. 3 (1943): 437–438.
Benjamin S. Terry, "Review of The Law of Civilization and Decay". The American Journal of Sociology vol. 2, no. 3 (1896): 467–472.

References

External links 
The Law of Civilization and Decay, complete text @ Archive.org

1895 non-fiction books
American political books